Jagan Kumar is an Indian professional motorcycle racer who has won Nine National motorcycle racing championships. Racing for the team TVS Racing.

He was the first Indian to win in Asia Road Racing(Suzuki Asian Challenge). He won second place in the Asian Challenge in the year 2015 and 2016.

He was the Undefeated National champion in the year 2012 to 2018.

He currently competes in Indian National motorcycle racing championship and Asian road racing championship.

References

Indian motorsport people
Indian motorcycle racers
Living people
Year of birth missing (living people)